The Convent of Our Lady of Calvary, also named Convent of the Filles du Calvaire, is a former Roman Catholic convent in Paris, France.

Location 

History 
The nuns settled in the building in 1633. The foundation stone of the church was laid in 1635 by Dutchess d'Aiguillon, who was standing in for her uncle Cardinal Richelieu.

The convent, completed on April 10, 1637, was supposed to be named the "Convent of the Crucifixion" as requested by Father Joseph, but the church was consecrated in 1650 as the "Church of the Transfiguration". In the same period, the nuns of Our Lady took possession of the church.

The Congregation of Our Lady of Calvary was dissolved in 1790 during the French Revolution, and their property was sold as a national good on Vendémiaire 8, Year V (September 29, 1796). In 1804, the Rue Neuve-de-Bretagne (now ) and Rue Neuve-de-Ménilmontant (now ), were established through the site of the former convent, without any permission. They were incorporated into the public road system in 1806. A third street and a passageway, which were planned as a part of the housing estate plan on the site, were not established.

References

Bibliography 

 Napoléon Chaix, Paris guide, 1807 , Librairie internationale.
 Jacques Hillairet, Dictionnaire historique des rues de Paris .
 Félix et Louis Lazare, Dictionnaire administratif et historique des rues de Paris et de ses monuments , 1844. 
 Jean de La Tynna, Dictionnaire topographique, étymologique et historique des rues de Paris , 1817.

Convents in Paris
Former buildings and structures in Paris
1630s establishments in France
Destroyed churches in France
Roman Catholic churches in the 3rd arrondissement of Paris